Frank Coutts may refer to:
 Frank Coutts (Australian footballer), Australian rules footballer
 Frank Coutts (rugby union), Scottish rugby union player

See also
 Frank Coutts Hendry, Indian Army officer and author